Senator Kilby may refer to:

Thomas Kilby (1865–1943), Alabama State Senate
Tommy Kilby (born 1964), Tennessee State Senate